Dhrubatara was an Indian Bengali television Romantic thriller which used to air on Star Jalsha and is also available on digital platform Disney+ Hotstar. It was premiered on 27 January 2020  The show produced by Acropoliis Entertainment Pvt. Ltd., starred Shyamoupti Mudly and Indrajeet Bose as the titular protagonists Tara and Dhruba respectively. It ended on 19 September 2021 with a happy note.

Premise 
In spite of having some misconception, childhood friends Tara and Agni used to love each other. But the arrival of Dhrubajyoti Lahiri, a business tycoon with his motive of exacting revenge on Agni's family and his marriage with Tara not only twisted that equation but also inserted a tale of love, compromise, conspiracy and revenge.

Cast

Main 
 Shyamoupti Mudly as Tara Lahiri (disguised Rai / Mrs Iyer)- a young girl of nearly 20; Shekhar's adopted daughter; Agni's childhood friend and former love interest; Dhrubo's wife and love interest; Gurudev and Supriya's daughter-in-law; Ranja and Chandra's arch-rival; Ron's former rival and love interest; Anuja's former rival;  Gunja and Shlok's step-mother; Uma's mother; a businesswoman and founder of Dhrubatara Industries. (2020-2021)
 Indrajeet Bose as
 Dhrubajyoti Lahiri (aka Dhrubo / Mr. Lahiri)- a rich and powerful businessman who was around 40, owner of Lahiri Industries and later of Dhrubatara Industries (after he lost his old business due to Anuja and Gurudev's conspiracy); Shekhar and Agni's former rival; Anuja's former husband; Gurudev's illegitimate son; Supriya's youngest son; Gautam's adopted son; Dipti's adoptive elder brother; Ranja's half-brother and rival; Tara's husband and love interest; Ron's twin brother; Gunja, Uma and Shlok's father. (2020-2021)
 Ronodev Chowdhury/Ron - Supriya's eldest son; Dhrubo's twin brother, former rival and imposter; Tara's fake husband and former rival (later fell in love with her after witnessing her kind-attitude towards him); owner of 'RR Enterprise'. He was accidentally killed by Sid. (Killed) (2021)
 Suvajit Kar as Agni Chowdhury (disguised Mr. Iyer)- Shekhar's only son; a businessman; Tara's childhood friend and one-sided lover; Chandni's brother; Shirish's love rival; Gunja's husband and love interest; Dhrubo's former rival, employee and son-in-law; CEO of Dhrubotara Industries. (2020-2021)
 Kritika Chakraborty as Uma Lahiri- Dhrubo and Tara's daughter, Gunja and Shlok's half-sister, she possesses supernatural powers. (2021)

Recurring

Chowdhury family
 Animesh Bhaduri as Shekhar Chowdhury- a businessman, owner of Chowdhury Textiles, Agni and Chandni's father, Tara's dotting father, Dhrubo's former rival, Ranja's former boss (Deceased) (2020)
 Moyna Mukherjee as Manju Chowdhury- Agni and Chandni's mother, Shekhar's wife (Deceased) (2020)
 Suchandra Chowdhury as Shekhar, Anjali and Saikat's mother, Agni and Chadni's paternal grandmother (2020)
 Sanchari Mondal as Chandni Roy (née Chowdhury, formerly Banerjee)- Shekhar's elder daughter, Agni's younger sister,  Roshan's former wife,  Rajib's love-interest turned wife (2020-2021)
 Mallika Majumdar as Anjali Chowdhury: Shekhar's younger sister, Saikat's elder sister, Agni's paternal aunt, Tara's benevolent governess. She raised Tara. (2020-2021)
 Rayati Bhattacharya as Dipti Chowdhury (née Lahiri)- Dhrubo's youngest adopted sister, Ranja's adopted half-sister and rival, Agni's paternal aunt, Supriya's adoptive daughter, Saikat's wife (2020)
 Avijit Sengupta as Saikat Chowdhury- Shekhar's younger brother, Dipti's husband, Agni's paternal uncle, Dhrubo's youngest brother-in-law (2020)
 Subhrajit Dutta as Ashish- Agni's maternal uncle, Manju's brother, who conspired against Agni's family and constantly tried to defame Tara. (2020)
 Shreyasee Samanta as Shirsha- Ashish's wife (2020)

Lahiri family
 Priyantika Karmakar / Debarati Paul as Gunja Chowdhury (née Lahiri)- Dhrubo and Anuja's elder daughter, Shirish's childhood friend and love interest; Agni's love interest turned wife, Tania's love rival, Mahi's younger cousin sister, Tara's step-daughter, Shlok's elder sister, Uma's elder half-sister. Despite initial reluctance, she later accepted Tara as her mother. (2020-2021)
Sanghita Ghosh / Tania Kar as Anuja Lahiri- Dhrubo's ex-wife; Gunja and Shlok's mother; a traitor who conspired against Dhrubo's family along with her boyfriend Sid; Tara and Chandni's former closest enemy; the entire Lahiri family's former rival. Later she was accidentally killed by Ron. (Killed) (2020-2021)
 Tanuka Chatterjee as Supriya Lahiri- Dhrubo and Ron's mother, Dipti's adoptive mother, Gurudev's ex-lover; Ranja's step-mother, the late Gautam's wife, head of Lahiri family.(2020-2021)
 Namita Chakraborty as Dulu Chatterjee/ Dulu Pishi - Gautam's younger sister, Dhrubo, Ron and Ranja's paternal aunt, Kush's aunt, Rima's mother (2020-2021)
 Sreejita Biswas as Rima - Dulu Pishi's daughter (2021)
 Rupsha Guha / Rii Sen as Ranja Banerjee (née Lahiri) / Ronita Chatterjee (fake identity) / Gurumaa- a shrewd and corrupt businesswoman; Dhrubo's half-sister and rival, who conspired against Shekhar's family and constantly instigated his brother Dhrubo against them, thus creating a rivalry between the two families; Dipti's adoptive elder half-sister and rival; Gautam's daughter; Supriya's step-daughter; Dhrubo, Tara and the entire Chowdhury and Lahiri family's rival; Animesh's wife; Roshan and Mahi's mother. Later, she faked her death and disguised herself as Guruma in order to swear revenge. Also she formed a company named 'RR Enterprise', in order to destroy Dhruba and Tara's business.(Jailed) (2020-2021)
 Raj Sen as Roshan Banerjee- Animesh and Ranja's only son, Chandni's former husband, Mahi's younger brother, Kush's younger brother-in-law, Gunja, Shlok and Uma's elder cousin brother, Dhrubo's nephew (Jailed) (2020-2021)
 Avijit Dev Roy as Animesh Banerjee- Ranja's husband, Roshan and Mahi's father, Dhrubo's brother-in-law (2020-2021)
 Shakshi Roy as Mahi Chatterjee (née Banerjee) - Animesh and Ranja's daughter, Roshan's younger sister, Gunja, Shlok and Uma's cousin sister, Kush's love interest and wife, Dhrubo's niece (2020-2021)
 Ayush Das as grown-up Shlok Lahiri- Anuja and Dhrubo's youngest son; Tara's step-son; Gunja's brother; Mahi's younger cousin brother, Uma's elder half-brother; Tuli's love interest (2021)

Others
 Kunal Banerjee as Dr. Kush Chatterjee- a doctor, Animesh and Ranja's son-in-law, Roshan's elder brother-in-law, Gunja, Shlok and Uma's elder cousin brother-in-law, Dulu's nephew, Mahi's love interest and husband (2020-2021)
 Himanshu De as Ratan Adhikari/ Mr. Adhikari- Manager of Lahiri Industries and later of Dhrubotara Industries (Dhrubajyoti Lahiri's official manager) who supported Dhrubo and Tara (2020-2021)
 Indranil Mallick as Siddhartha Chowdhury aka Sid- Dhrubo's college friend turned foe; Anuja's former boyfriend; Chandra's adopted son (Jailed) (2020-2021)
 Kushal Papai Bhowmick as Shirish Sanyal- Gunja's childhood friend and ex-fiancé, Agni's love rival, son of Mr. Sanyal (Dhrubo's business partner) (Jailed) (2020-2021)
 Debargha Majumdar as Sameer Agarwal- Mahi's ex-fiancé, son of industrialist Mr. Agarwal,  a spoilt-brat and alcoholic (Jailed) (2020)
 Ratan Sarkhel as Keshav Chandra Ghosh aka Gurudev- Supriya's ex-lover who was jailed for 12 years for molesting her, Dhrubo and Ron's estranged father and former rival; the Lahiri family's former rival; Tara's former rival; Anuja's former influential teacher (jailed for seven years) (2020-2021)
 Purbasha Debnath as Anurupa- Gurudev's pupil, Tara's enemy (jailed) (2021)
 Prarona Bhattacharya as Mili- Gurudev's pupil who befriends Tara (2021)
 Biresh Chakraborty as Inspector Rajib Roy- an honest police officer, Dhrubo's best friend, Chandni's love interest and second husband (2021)
 Arpita Mondal as Taniya Sen- Agni's friend and assistant; Gunja's love rival (2021)
 Liza Sarkar as Tuli Sen- Taniya's younger sister; Shlok's friend and love interest (2021)
 Moumita Chakrabarty as Chandra Chowdhury- Ron, Dhrubo and Ranja's maternal aunt, Sid's adoptive mother, rival of the Lahiri family (Jailed) (2021)

Guest appearance
 Gora Dhar as a police officer.

References

External links 

 Dhrubatara on Hotstar

Bengali-language television programming in India
2020 Indian television series debuts
2021 Indian television series endings
Star Jalsha original programming
Indian thriller television series
Indian drama television series